Kalidasa is a genus of planthoppers in the tribe Aphaenini of the family Fulgoridae. There are four species in the genus, which are found in different parts of tropical Asia.

Species
Four species are listed:
 Kalidasa lanata (Drury, 1773)
 Kalidasa lui Wang & Huang, 1989
 Kalidasa nigromaculata (Gray, 1832) 
 synonym Kalidasa paulinia (Signoret, 1862)
 Kalidasa sanguinalis (Westwood, 1851)

Description
They have a slender and flexible stalk-like outgrowth arising from above the tip of the snout.

References

External links
 

Hemiptera of Asia
Auchenorrhyncha genera
Aphaeninae